Darko Bajo (born March 14, 1999) is a Croatian professional basketball player for Karlsruhe Lions of the German ProA.

Career 
On October 23, 2015, Bajo signed his first professional contract with Cedevita.

References

External links 
 ABA League Profile
 RealGM Profile
 Eurobasket.com Profile
 NBADraft Profile

Living people
1999 births
ABA League players
Croats of Bosnia and Herzegovina
Croatian men's basketball players
KK Cedevita players
Power forwards (basketball)
PS Karlsruhe Lions players
KK Split players